Tungsten(VI) fluoride, also known as tungsten hexafluoride, is an inorganic compound with the formula WF6. It is one of the densest known gases under standard conditions. WF6 ls commonly used by the semiconductor industry to form tungsten films, through the process of chemical vapor deposition. This layer is used in a low-resistivity metallic "interconnect". It is one of seventeen known binary hexafluorides.

Properties
The WF6 molecule is octahedral with the symmetry point group of Oh. At  it freezes into a white solid having a cubic crystalline structure, the lattice constant of 628 pm and calculated density . Whereas WF6 gas is one of the densest gases, with the density exceeding that of the heaviest elemental gas radon (9.73 g/L), the density of WF6 in the liquid and solid state is rather moderate.
The vapor pressure of WF6 between  can be described by the equation
,
where the P = vapor pressure (bar), T = temperature (°C).

Synthesis
Tungsten hexafluoride is commonly produced by the exothermic reaction of fluorine gas with tungsten powder at a temperature between :
W + 3 F2 → WF6
The gaseous product is separated from WOF4, a common impurity, by distillation.

An alternative procedure for producing tungsten fluoride is to react tungsten trioxide (WO3) with HF, BrF3 or SF4. Tungsten fluoride can also be obtained by conversion of tungsten hexachloride:
WCl6 + 6 HF  → WF6 + 6 HCl    or
WCl6 + 2 AsF3 → WF6 + 2 AsCl3  or
WCl6 + 3 SbF5 → WF6 + 3 SbF3Cl2

Reactions
On contact with water, tungsten hexafluoride gives hydrogen fluoride (HF) and tungsten oxyfluorides, eventually forming tungsten trioxide:
WF6 + 3 H2O → WO3 + 6 HF

Unlike some other metal fluorides, WF6 is not a useful fluorinating agent nor is it a powerful oxidant. It can be reduced to the yellow WF4.

Applications in semiconductor industry
The dominant application of tungsten fluoride is in semiconductor industry, where it is widely used for depositing tungsten metal in a chemical vapor deposition process. The expansion of the industry in the 1980s and 1990s resulted in the increase of WF6 consumption, which remains at around 200 tonnes per year worldwide. Tungsten metal is attractive because of its relatively high thermal and chemical stability, as well as low resistivity (5.6 μΩ·cm) and very low electromigration. WF6 is favored over related compounds, such as WCl6 or WBr6, because of its higher vapor pressure resulting in higher deposition rates. Since 1967, two WF6 deposition routes have been developed and employed, thermal decomposition and hydrogen reduction. The required WF6 gas purity is rather high and varies between 99.98% and 99.9995% depending on the application.

WF6 molecules have to be split up in the CVD process. The decomposition is usually facilitated by mixing WF6 with hydrogen, silane, germane, diborane, phosphine, and related hydrogen-containing gases.

Silicon
WF6 reacts upon contact with a silicon substrate. The WF6 decomposition on silicon is temperature-dependent:

This dependence is crucial, as twice as much silicon is being consumed at higher temperatures. The deposition occurs selectively on pure Si only, but not on silicon oxide or nitride, thus the reaction is highly sensitive to contamination or substrate pre-treatment. The decomposition reaction is fast, but saturates when the tungsten layer thickness reaches 10–15 micrometers. The saturation occurs because the tungsten layer stops diffusion of WF6 molecules to the Si substrate which is the only catalyst of molecular decomposition in this process.

If the deposition occurs not in an inert but in an oxygen containing atmosphere (air) then instead of tungsten, a tungsten oxide layer is produced.

Hydrogen
The deposition process occurs at temperatures between 300 and 800 °C and results in formation of hydrogen fluoride vapors:
WF6 + 3 H2 → W + 6 HF

The crystallinity of the produced tungsten layers can be controlled by altering the WF6/H2 ratio and the substrate temperature: low ratios and temperatures result in (100) oriented tungsten crystallites whereas higher values favor the (111) orientation. Formation of HF is a drawback, as the HF vapor is very aggressive and etches away most materials. Also, the deposited tungsten shows poor adhesion to the silicon dioxide which is the main passivation material in semiconductor electronics. Therefore, SiO2 has to be covered with an extra buffer layer prior to the tungsten deposition. On the other hand, etching by HF may be beneficial to remove unwanted impurity layers.

Silane and germane
The characteristic features of tungsten deposition from the WF6/SiH4 are high speed, good adhesion and layer smoothness. The drawbacks are explosion hazard and high sensitivity of the deposition rate and morphology to the process parameters, such as mixing ratio, substrate temperature, etc. Therefore, silane is commonly used to create a thin tungsten nucleation layer. It is then switched to hydrogen, that slows down the deposition and cleans up the layer.

Deposition from WF6/GeH4 mixture is similar to that of WF6/SiH4, but the tungsten layer becomes contaminated with relatively (compared to Si) heavy germanium up to concentrations of 10–15%. This increases tungsten resistance from about 5 to 200 μΩ·cm.

Other applications
WF6 can be used for the production of tungsten carbide.

As a heavy gas, WF6 can be used as a buffer to control gas reactions. For example, it slows down the chemistry of the Ar/O2/H2 flame and reduces the flame temperature.

Safety
Tungsten hexafluoride is an extremely corrosive compound that attacks any tissue. Because of the formation of hydrofluoric acid upon reaction of WF6 with humidity, WF6 storage vessels have Teflon gaskets.

References

Tungsten halides
Hexafluorides
Lachrymatory agents
Octahedral compounds
Industrial gases